Abu'l 'Abbas Al Dandarawi (1898–1953) was an Egyptian sufi scholar and the sheikh of Dandarawiya which is a sufi order originated from Moroccan Ahmad bin Idris. The order was founded by one of Idris's eminent pupils, Ibrahim Al Rashid, and is known to be the Rashidi Ahmadi branch of the Idrisi tradition.

Biography
Al Dandarawi was born in 1898. His father, Muhammad, was from in Dandara, Upper Egypt, where he was born in 1839. He was educated by Ibrahim Al Rashid, a Sudanese disciple of Ahmad bin Idris, in Mecca and settled in Medina following his travels to East Africa and Syria to disseminate the views of the Ahmadiyya order. He lived there as the successor of Ibrahim Al Rashid until his death in 1910.

Al Dandarawi had two siblings, a younger brother, Abdul Wahap and a sister. Following the death of his father Al Dandarawi succeeded him as the sheikh of the order. He was extremely popular among his Sudanese followers. In 1941 Al Dandarawi had to leave Mecca due to a dispute with King Abdulaziz and Wahhabists over the celebration of Mawlid Al Nabi or the observance of the birthday of the Islamic prophet Muhammad. 

Al Dandarawi died in 1953, and his son Abu Fadl bin Abul Abbas Al Dandarawi succeeded him as the sheikh of the order.

References

20th-century Muslim scholars of Islam
1898 births
1953 deaths
Egyptian Sufis